Charles Hines (1892–1936) was an American actor and film director of the silent era. Born in Pennsylvania, he was the second of three brothers who had careers in the new film industry. He died at the age of 43 in Los Angeles, California.

His younger brother, actor Johnny Hines, appeared in 50 films, mostly during the silent era. Hines directed him in some of these films. Their older brother Samuel E. Hines had mostly bit-parts in silents.

Selected filmography

 The Argyle Case (1917) (actor)
 Conductor 1492 (1924)
 The Speed Spook (1924)
 The Early Bird (1925)
 The Crackerjack (1925)
 The Live Wire (1925)
 Rainbow Riley (1926)
 Stepping Along (1926)
 The Brown Derby (1926)
 White Pants Willie (1927)
 All Aboard (1927)
 Home Made (1927)
 Chinatown Charlie (1928)
 The Wright Idea (1928)
 Wings in the Dark (1935) (actor)

References

Bibliography
 Munden, Kenneth White. The American Film Institute Catalog of Motion Pictures Produced in the United States, Part 1. University of California Press, 1997.

External links

1892 births
1936 deaths
American film directors
People from Pennsylvania